Ron Nicholls can refer to:

 Ron Nicholls (cricketer, born 1933) (1933–1994), English cricketer and footballer
 Ron Nicholls (cricketer, born 1951), Australian cricketer